Meduna di Livenza is a comune (municipality) in the Province of Treviso in the Italian region Veneto, located about  northeast of Venice and about  northeast of Treviso.

Meduna di Livenza borders the following municipalities: Annone Veneto, Gorgo al Monticano, Motta di Livenza, Pasiano di Pordenone, Pravisdomini.

References

Cities and towns in Veneto